British Railways operated a number of ships from its formation in 1948 on a variety of routes. Many ships were acquired on nationalisation, and others were built for operation by British Railways or its later subsidiary, Sealink. Those ships capable of carrying rail vehicles were classed under TOPS as Class 99.

Ships

References

 Ships
Ferries of the United Kingdom